The Al-Madinah International University (MEDIU) is an independent educational institution in Malaysia. It was established in 2006, founded on Islamic principles and values.

MEDIU is licensed by the Ministry of Higher Education (MOHE), government of Malaysia. Its programs are accredited by the Malaysian Qualification Agency (MQA). The university aims for knowledge development and intellectual exchange consistent with international level of excellence. It is managed by CEO [Dr. Abdullah bin Saad Alarefi].

MEDIU offers classes on campus and online.

History
MEDIU was established in 2006. On 20 May 2007, it was registered and accredited by the Ministry of Higher Education (MOHE), Government of Malaysia.

In 2008, the first intake of students joined and faculties and programs were inaugurated such as Islamic Sciences, Languages, Finance and Administrative Sciences, and Computer and Informational Technology and Centre of Languages. The number of university’s centres providing services reached nine, in South East Asia, Middle East and Europe.

The university completed the procedures to begin face-to-face learning in scientific and applied fields included computer science, Finance and Administrative sciences, Engineering. In September 2010 the first face-to-face intake of students joined the university.

In 2011, the first batch of graduate students attended graduation day in the Faculty of Languages and Faculty of Islamic Sciences.

In 2012, MEDIU signed a memorandum with Granada International College (GIC) in the field of education development. In 2013, MARA approved the registration and sponsorship program for degree-level courses in MEDIU in the field of Islamic Sciences and Arabic languages under the MARA study loan scheme.

In 2014, 2,265 students enrolled for the February intake. MEDIU launched official website in French version and got recognition of its academic programs by the Ministry of Higher Education and Scientific Research in Yemen and Nigeria. A total of 40 academic programs has received full accreditation status by MQA.

In 2015, it received recognition of academic programs by the Ministry of Higher Education in Syrian Arab Republic, Republic of Sudan and Palestine. Scientific publication Majma and Arrasikhun Journal were distributed. The university had 2,384 active students from 84 nationalities and 1,982 graduates from 70 nationalities. A total of 48 academic programs has received full accreditation status by MQA.

Establishment and government recognition
The idea of establishing Al-Madinah International University was mooted by a group of Muslim scholars. Al-Madinah International University was named after Al-Madinah Al-Munawwarah, the city where Muhammad established the capital of the first Islamic state, which is considered the qiblah for those seeking Islamic knowledge.

MEDIU obtained approval as a university from the Ministry of Higher Education (MOHE) Malaysia on 26 December 2006 and was registered on 20 June 2007 (KPT/JPS/DFT/US/B22).

MEDIU operates under Malaysia’s Private Higher Education (MOHE) Act of 1996 (Act 555) which governs its establishment and the administration.

Academic programs
Al-Madinah International University offers taught courses and research programs. There are six faculties: Islamic Sciences, Engineering, Finance & Administrative Sciences, Computer & Information Technology, Education, and Languages. Academic programs are designed by scholars with extensive academic and work experience. MEDIU academic programs assist students towards enhancing their knowledge and skills.
 
Academic programs include following levels:

 Diploma
 Bachelors
 Masters
 PhD

Research programs
MEDIU offers academic research programs. High-caliber research supervisors guide and support students to conduct academically advanced and intellectually exciting research to solve critical problems. The research programs help students to explore unique and challenging venues. The university offers more than 35 areas of postgraduate research programs at Master's and Doctoral levels.

Methods of study
 On-campus learning is used at Al-Madinah International University (MEDIU) for educational programs for which the student has to be at a campus at a specific time to follow the programs, with the assistance of the teacher, professor, or teaching assistant. See MEDIU Academic Staff.
 Online learning is based on an authentic system of learning and evaluation process. Students physically appear in mid-term and final-term exams in authorized exam centers of their respective countries, finalized by the university. The learning method includes all forms of electronically supported learning and teaching, including Edtech. Students have to participate in classes through technology. They are required to meet the minimum requirement (70%) of class attendance.

Relationships with global institutions and universities
MEDIU has signed memorandums of understanding with 21 global institutions and universities including:
 Arees University (USA)
 University of Knowledge (Saudi Arabia)
 East Asia Foundation (Philippines)
 Multimedia University (Malaysia)
 Ibn Khaldun University (Indonesia)
 El-Fetra Foundation (Netherlands)

This cooperation takes several forms: exchange of faculty and students between MEDIU and other universities, use of experts from foreign universities to review the university’s programs, and cooperation in scientific research programs and community service.

Faculties
 Faculty of Islamic Sciences
 Faculty of Languages
 Faculty of Computer and Information Technology
 Faculty of Finance & Administrative Sciences
 Faculty of Education
 Faculty of Engineering
 Center of Preparatory Studies & Languages

References

Ministry of Education, Government of Malaysia: https://web.archive.org/web/20150513010308/http://www.moe.gov.my/pdf/MOHE/tempat%20pengajian%20mybrain15.pdf. Retrieved on 21 May 2015
Malaysian Qualifications Agency: https://web.archive.org/web/20150514165737/http://www.mqa.gov.my/MQR/english/eakrbyipts.cfm. Retrieved on 21 May 2015

Islamic universities and colleges in Malaysia
Universities and colleges in Selangor
2006 establishments in Malaysia
Educational institutions established in 2006
Private universities and colleges in Malaysia